Yugoimport–SDPR is a Serbian state-owned weapons manufacturer as well as intermediary company for the import and export of defense-related equipment. It is headquartered in Belgrade, with production facilities in Velika Plana, Kuršumlija, Uzići and Pančevo.

History
The company was founded on June 18, 1949 by the decree of the Prime Minister of Yugoslavia Josip Broz Tito, with the primary goal of importing parts and raw materials for the needs of the domestic military industry. Over time, domestic production outgrew the needs of the domestic market, so Yugoimport started orienting towards foreign markets. Yugoimport started exporting weapons in 1953. By a state resolution in 1974, affairs related to the import and export of weapons were centralized within the framework of the newly formed Federal Directorate for Procurement, where Jugoimport was also involved.

After the resolution of the Republic of Serbia on June 8, 2006 and several reorganizations, Yugoimport-SDPR is positioned as a company fully owned by the state. During the long history of business, the company made a business balance of approximately 22 billion dollars through the trade of weapons, equipment and technology.

Manufacturing
The company works in cooperation with the Military Technical Institute in developing wide array of weapons, from artillery systems and armoured vehicles to trainer aircraft and unmanned aerial vehicles. Recent flagship products include Nora B-52 155 mm self-propelled howitzer, Lazar and Miloš multi-role armoured vehicles, Lasta 95 light trainer aircraft, Pegaz drone, and Premax 39 river patrol boat. 

Manufacturing is organized through following subsidiary: 

Borbeni složeni sistemi ("Complex Fighting Systems") manufactures artillery systems and armoured vehicles at its facilities in Velika Plana and Kuršumlija.
Utva Aviation Industry manufactures military trainer aircraft and drones at its facility in Pančevo.
Belom manufactures small-caliber ammunition at its facility in Uzići near Požega.
Jugoimport livnice, Potisje precizni liv, Kovački centar produce metal components for artillery systems and armoured vehicles.

Products

Artillery systems
122mm Sora self-propelled howitzer
155mm Nora B-52 self-propelled howitzer
155mm Aleksandar self-propelled howitzer

Armoured vehicles
 BOV M11 armoured reconnaissance vehicle  
 BOV M16 Miloš multi-role armoured vehicle 
 Lazar 1 multi-role armoured vehicle
 Lazar 2 multi-role armoured vehicle
 Lazar 3 multi-role armoured vehicle

Aircraft and UAV
Lasta 95 light trainer aircraft
Sova light trainer aircraft
Pegaz unmanned aerial vehicle
Vrabac unmanned aerial vehicle

Watercraft
 Premax 39 multirole fast patrol river boat

Anti-armour missiles (cooperation)

 175 mm ALAS long-range multipurpose wire guided missile system
 175 mm RALAS non line of sight light offensive rocket 
 136 mm Bumbar anti-tank missile

Import and export of weapons
The company is the sole intermediary company that represents the Serbian government and Serbian military–industrial complex in the sphere of importation and exportation of defense equipment as well as technology transfers (through selling production licenses to foreign customers, such as those for MLRS M-87 Oganj to Iraq, for grenade launchers to Azerbaijan, small-caliber ammunition to India and Algeria).

Engineering 
Yugoimport built many military and civilian objects in numerous countries around the world including airports, hospitals, command posts, including many civilian and military facilities for Iraq under Saddam Hussein's regime.

Engineering is organized through PMC Inženjering and Atera plus subsisidiaries.

See also
 Defense industry of Serbia

References

External links
 

1949 establishments in Serbia
Companies based in Belgrade
Conglomerate companies established in 1949
Defense industry of Serbia
Government-owned companies of Serbia
Manufacturing companies of Yugoslavia